Illumination may refer to:

Science and technology
 Illumination, an observable property and effect of light
 Illumination (lighting), the use of light sources
 Global illumination, algorithms used in 3D computer graphics

Spirituality and religion
 Divine illumination, the process of human thought needs to be aided by divine grace
 Illuminationism, c.q. Illuminationist philosophy, a doctrine according to which the process of human thought needs to be aided by divine grace
 Divine light, an aspect of divine presence

Arts and media
 Illumination (image), the use of light and shadow in art
 Illuminated manuscript, the artistic decoration of hand-written texts
 The Damnation of Theron Ware, a 1896 novel by Harold Frederic, first published in England as Illumination
 Illuminations (poetry collection), by French poet Arthur Rimbaud

Music

Albums
 Illumination!, 1964 album by the Elvin Jones/Jimmy Garrison Sextet
 Illumination (Walter Davis, Jr. album), 1977 album by American jazz pianist Walter Davis, Jr.
 Illumination (The Pastels album), 1997 album by the Scottish band The Pastels
 Illumination (Paul Weller album), 2002 album by English singer Paul Weller
 Illumination (Earth, Wind & Fire album), 2005 album by American R&B group Earth, Wind & Fire
 Illumination (Robert Rich album), 2007
 Illumination (Tristania album), 2007 album by Norwegian gothic metal band Tristania
 Illumination (Miami Horror album), 2010 album by Australian group Miami Horror
 Illumination, a 2012 album by Jennifer Thomas

Songs
 "Illumination", by Gogol Bordello from their 2005 album Gypsy Punks: Underdog World Strike
 "Illumination", by Lindsey Buckingham from his 2011 album Seeds We Sow
 Les Illuminations (Britten), a song cycle setting poems of Arthur Rimbaud
 "Illumination", by Heaven 17

Other uses
 Illumination (company), an American film and animation studio

See also
 Illuminations (disambiguation)